Beeskow is a town in Brandenburg, Germany, and capital of the Oder-Spree district. It is situated on the river Spree, 30 km southwest of Frankfurt an der Oder.

Demography

Personalities

Sons and daughters of the city 
 Karl August Otto Hoffmann (1853–1909), botanist
 Max Seiffert (1868–1948), musicologist, editor of ancient music
 Hans Sohnle (1895–1976), art director
 Otto Holzapfel (born 1941), folklorist and researcher of traditional German folk song (folk music, Lied)
 Joachim Mattern (born 1948), canoeist
 Judith Zeidler (born 1967), rower
 Jana Thieme (born 1970), rower
 Ronny Ostwald (born 1974), sprint athlete

References

External links

Localities in Oder-Spree